MS Kaiarahi is a RO-RO ferry operated by Interislander on the Wellington to Picton interisland route between the North and South islands of New Zealand.

History
Built as the Dawn Merchant for Cenargo International Ltd in 1998 and was launched in February 1998, that same year she was chartered to Und RORO for service in Turkey. In 1999 she was chartered to Norse Merchant Ferries and the Norfolkline in 2002. In 2005 she transferred back to Norse Merchant Ferries and was sold to Daybreak Shipping Ltd, where she was renamed the Europax Appia. In 2006 she was chartered to Balearia, where she was then renamed the Pau Casals and then in 2009 to T-Link Lines, where she was renamed the T-Rex.
In 2010 she was renamed the Norman Trader and chartered to LD Lines, she remained with them until the closure of the Dover to Boulogne route where she then transferred to other LD Lines routes until 2011, where she was chartered to both P&O Ferries and Stena Line and then she was laid up in the River Fal at Falmouth.

Sale to Stena Line
In May 2013 Stena Line announced that they were going to purchase the Norman Trader for their Gdynia to Karlskrona route, she headed by tow to Gdynia where she was refitted and renamed the Stena Alegra in June 2013, on 8 July 2013 she started operating on the Gdynia to Karlskrona route. On 28 October, Stena Alegra was driven ashore at Karlskrona during the St Jude storm.

Interislander charter
In November 2013 she was chartered by Interislander in New Zealand to operate on the Wellington–Picton route for six months. The charter was to assist the Interislander's two other ships ( and ) with peak summer loadings while its third ship, was out of service for repairs after losing a propeller in early November. During the charter, she suffered several mechanical problems, including an engine failure in Wellington Harbour, a six-metre gash in the hull during berthing difficulties, and the loss of part of a propeller blade, though she was repaired and put back into service shortly after these incidents.

On 9 December 2014, an announcement was made that she would again be chartered long term by Interislander to replace the aging Arahura, which had been in service since 1983 and was to retire in 2015. Before returning to New Zealand, she was refitted to better suit the Wellington to Picton route. She has been named Kaiarahi, from the Māori word for "leader" (kai- = agentive prefix, arahi = "to lead").

Kaiarahi suffered a major gearbox failure while on a regular Cook Strait sailing 31 August 2021. It has been out of service since. After lengthy repairs to her gearbox she resumed frieght only operation on 17 September 2022.

See also

 MV Isle of Inisheer - sister ship
MV Cracovia - heavily modified sister ship
 MS Finbo Cargo - sister ship
 AQUARIUS BRASIL (ex NORMAN BRIDGE / AVE LIEPAJA / BRAVE MERCHANT) imo: 9147306 sister ship (now accommodation vessel)

References

External links
MV Stena Alegra - MidShip Photos
Introducing Kaiarahi

Stena Line
Cook Strait ferries
1998 ships